Sonnegger See, also known as Lake Sonnegger, is an artificial lake, near Juntal in Austria. It rests in the municipality of Sittersdorf, in Carinthia. The lake was created in 1966, and is enclosed on the East and West sides by a dam. It was not designed for fishing; instead it is much better for swimming.

References

Lakes of Carinthia (state)